Nicklaus is a given name and surname. Notable people with the name include

Given name
Nicklaus Jordan Gardewine (born 1993), American baseball player known as Nick Gardewine
Nicklaus O'Leary (born 1992), American gridiron football player known as Nick O'Leary
Nicklaus Schandelmaier (born 1968), German musician known by his stage name En Esch
Nicklaus Thomas-Symonds (born 1980), Welsh politician known as Nick Thomas-Symonds
Nicklaus James Dellicastelli (born 1995), Australian filmmaker and actor

Surname
Gary Nicklaus (born 1969), American golfer
Gary Nicklaus Jr. (born 2003), American golfer
Jack Nicklaus (born 1940), American golfer
Windy Nicklaus (1904 – 1991), American football player and coach

See also

 Nickolaus
Niklaus (name)
Hans Niclaus

Lists of people by surname